Platygastrinae is a subfamily of parasitoid wasps in the family Platygastridae.

Genera 
Acerotella - Aceroteta - Allostemma - Allotropa - Almargella - Amblyaspis - Anectadius - Anirama - Annettella - Anopedias - Ceratacis - Criomica - Diplatygaster - Eritrissomerus - Euxestonotus - Gastrotrypes - Holocoeliella - Inostemma - Iphitrachelus - Isocybus - Isostasius - Leptacis - Magellanium - Metaclisis - Metanopedias - Moninostemma - Orseta - Piestopleura - Platygastemma - Platygaster - Platygasterites - Proleptacis - Proplatygaster - Prosactogaster - Prosinostemma - Prosynopeas - Pyrgaspis - Rao - Sacespalus - Stosta - Synopeas - Trichacis - Trichacoides - Tricholeptacis - Zelostemma

References

External links 
 
 

Platygastridae
Apocrita subfamilies
Articles containing video clips